The A Mountain Empire District is a high school conference of the Virginia High School League which draws its members from Southwest Virginia, west of the Roanoke metropolitan area.

The schools in the Mountain Empire District compete in A Region C with the schools of the A Hogoheegee District, the A Pioneer District and the A Three Rivers District. Mount Rogers is one of the two remaining consolidated K-12 schools in Virginia, due to its position at the extreme western end of Grayson County making it inadvisable to consolidate it into Grayson County High School. Its enrollment is typically around 25-30 students in grades 9-12, and so its participation in VHSL team activities will be sporadic. Pocahontas High School used to be in the Mountain Empire District but the school closed at the end of the 2007-2008 academic year. Graham High School (Bluefield, Virginia), left the district after 6 years in 2017.
Mount Rogers is now part of Grayson County High School.  The MED re-formed this year to include Rural Retreat, George Wythe and Auburn which was a former member prior to joining the Three Rivers District.  Graham returned to the Southwest District where they were a long time member and Narrows joined the Pioneer District.

Member schools
Bland County High School of Rocky Gap, Virginia
Fort Chiswell High School of Max Meadows, Virginia
Galax High School of Galax, Virginia
Grayson County High School of Independence, Virginia
Auburn High School, Riner, VA
Rural Retreat High School, Rural Retreat, VA
George Wythe High School, Wytheville, VA

Virginia High School League